Tariquía Flora and Fauna National Reserve (Reserva Nacional de Flora y Fauna Tariquía) is a protected area in the Tarija Department, Bolivia, situated in the Aniceto Arce Province, Burnet O'Connor Province, Gran Chaco Province and José María Avilés Province. It protects part of the Central Andean puna, Southern Andean Yungas, and Bolivian montane dry forests ecoregions.

See also 
 Baritú National Park

References

External links 
 www.fundesnap.org / Tariquía Flora and Fauna National Reserve (Spanish)

Nature reserves in Bolivia
Geography of Tarija Department
Gran Chaco
Forests of Bolivia
Protected areas established in 1989
Southern Andean Yungas